Sir Archibald Orr-Ewing, 1st Baronet (4 January 1818 – 28 November 1893) was a Scottish Conservative Party politician.

The Orr Ewing Baronetcy, of Ballikinrain in the County of Stirling and of Lennoxbank in the County of Dunbarton, was created in the Baronetage of the United Kingdom on 8 March 1886 for the Conservative politician Archibald Orr-Ewing. He was the seventh son of William Ewing, a merchant of Glasgow, and Susan, daughter of John Orr, Provost of Paisley.

Archibald was Member of Parliament (MP) for Dunbartonshire from 1868 to 1892

Sir Archibald was a deputy lieutenant (D.L.) of Dunbartonshire and for Stirlingshire. He was a justice of the peace (J.P.) for Inverness-shire and for Stirlingshire. He was the Ensign-General of the Royal Company of Archers and Dean of Faculties at the University of Glasgow

On 27 April 1847, he married Elizabeth Lindsay Reid and they had four children:

Sir William Orr-Ewing, 2nd Bt. (1848–1903)
Sir Archibald Ernest Orr-Ewing, 3rd Bt. (1853–1919)
Janet Edith Orr-Ewing (d. 1935)
Charles Lindsay Orr-Ewing (1860–1903)

In 1864 Sir Archibald commissioned David Bryce to design his new home, Ballikinrain Castle, which was completed in 1868.

References

External links 
 

1847 births
1893 deaths
Members of the Parliament of the United Kingdom for Scottish constituencies
Baronets in the Baronetage of the United Kingdom
UK MPs 1868–1874
UK MPs 1874–1880
UK MPs 1880–1885
UK MPs 1885–1886
UK MPs 1886–1892
Scottish Tory MPs (pre-1912)
Members of the Royal Company of Archers